"May" is the twenty-eighth single by B'z, released on May 24, 2000. This song is one of B'z many number-one singles in Oricon chart, although sales were not as high as their previous single.

Track listing 
May - 4:19
You pray, I stay - 4:14

Certifications

References 
B'z performance at Oricon

External links
B'z official website

2000 singles
B'z songs
Oricon Weekly number-one singles
Songs written by Tak Matsumoto
Songs written by Koshi Inaba
2000 songs